IBM manufactured and sold document processing equipment such as proof machines, inscribers and document reader/sorters for financial institutions from 1934 to 2005.

IBM and document processing 
Prior to the introduction of computers, cheque processing was performed manually by each institution.  IBM recognised the opportunity to automate this processing and began a long period of building machines for this purpose, a period that started when IBM announced the IBM 801 Bank Proof machine in 1934.   By eliminating hand written ledgers, the IBM 801 automated teller operations.

By the mid 1950s many banks began to investigate how they could use new technology to help them handle the ever growing volume of cheques that needed to be processed on a daily basis.   As an example, Bank of America's checking accounts were growing at a rate of 23,000 per month and banks were being forced to close their doors by 2 p.m. to finish daily postings. Meanwhile, in the United Kingdom, wages began to be paid by cheque and the number of cheques being cleared by the central clearing house had grown from around 250 million in 1938, to around 320 million in 1951 and continued ramping up, in fact reaching over 500 million by 1964.

A number of technologies were developed by companies like EMI in the UK (Figure Reading Electronic Device or FRED), and Bull in France (CMC-7) to make cheques machine readable by means of pre-printed characters or characters that were inscribed on the cheque when it was being proofed at the Branch.  IBM Poughkeepsie lab under J.A. Weidenhammer meanwhile was working on developing equipment that could mechanically feed, transport and stack paper checks, because they could not be handled using existing techniques then being used with punched cards.  They created a system of friction wheels and belts to achieve this.  Meanwhile, another group within IBM collaborated with Weidenhammer on developing a machine readable magnetic ink barcode, printed below human readable numerals, which they demonstrated to Barclays Bank in 1957. But after much industry consultation, the E-13B MICR font developed by General Electric as part of a solution sold to Bank to America became the American Standard adopted by the ABA in 1958.  The ABA had previously concluded that IBM's proposed marking system would be too costly and also, that it was visually unattractive.   After some hesitation, IBM developed their own multi-track read head for MICR characters and switched to using E-13B.  In 1959 they began promoting the IBM 1210.   IBM Supplies division (that also manufactured punched cards) also saw an opportunity in this period to sell paper checks, printed by IBM in an IBM Plant.

IBMs main competitors in this space in 1959 were Burroughs with their B101 Reader/Sorter which could sort 1560 documents per minute, sold as part of their B251 Visible Record Computer System, and NCR who sold a sorter jointly developed with Pitney-Bowes that also used components supplied by General Electric.

By 1963 the  American National Standards Institute (ANSI) adopted the ABA specifications as the American Standard, along with countries like the UK, Canada and Australia. Meanwhile, CMC-7 was adopted as the French standard in 1964 and grew to be widely used in Europe and South America.

Adoption of these sorters was usually linked to adoption of the Computer System it attached to, although the first 1210 rented by Barclays Bank in 1960 was used purely in an offline capacity before the Bank bought an IBM 1419 attached to an IBM 1401 in 1963.  Initial adoption also required new procedures and standards to be adopted, for instance Martins Bank in the UK took delivery of an IBM 1412 on 22 October 1961, but it was not fully operational till April 1963.

Document processing usually involved the following process.  Firstly documents to be proofed would be loaded into the hopper of a proof machine and then fed through the machine one at a time.   For each document:

 The document would be read:  The operator would read the value of each document and key that value into the machine.   The machine would keep a running total of amounts and usually print that out.
 The document would be inscribed: Inscribing was the process of printing the value of the document onto the document, so it could be electrically read back by either the proof machine or a reader/sorter.   
 The document would be endorsed:  Endorsing was the processing of stamping the document, either on the front or the back or both.
 The document would be sorted:  Proof machines could then sort the document into pockets.

As an example the IBM 4723 order of operations was described as follows:Hopper --> View --> Slot --> Read -> Stamp front (Endorse)  -->. Audit Trail Print --> Inscribe -->. Stamp back (Endorse) -->. Sort (into 1 of 3 pockets)After proofing the  documents would then be sent to a reader/sorter for data capture and final sorting.   The sorter may endorse the document as well as print a sequence number on the document.  The sorter may also microfilm the document, while later sorters may have used document imaging technology.

Proofing machines and Inscribers

IBM 801 
Announced by IBM in 1934, the IBM 801 could list and separate checks, endorse them and record totals. It was withdrawn on Jan 18,1956. The 801 is unrelated to the later IBM 801 processor.

IBM 803 
Announced by IBM in July 1949, the IBM 803 is a proofing machine that could sort, list, prove and endorse checks and sort them into 32 pockets.  This machine remained in the IBM Sales Manual till Dec 18, 1981.

IBM 1201 
The IBM 1201 is a proof inscriber, that could perform all the functions of an IBM 803 (which it closely resembled) as well as document inscribing.   It has 10 models offering a variety of options including up to 32 pockets plus document endorsing as an optional feature.   IBM Rochester began shipping the IBM 1201 in August 1961.  In 1963 IBM Supplies introduced a new endorsing roll for the IBM 1201 which can provide for up to 375,000 endorsements.  It was withdrawn on Nov 22, 1978.

IBM 1202 
The IBM 1202 Utility Inscriber is a specially designed electric type-writer that is used to inscribe documents prior to them being sorted. It was announced Jan 12, 1959 and withdrawn April 26, 1966.

IBM 1203 
The IBM 1203 is a unit inscriber that can print numerals and special symbols on documents using magnetic ink.   It is also an adding machine.  It was manufactured by IBM Rochester.  It was announced Mar 8, 1961 and withdrawn Nov 22, 1978.

IBM 1206 
The IBM 1206 described either as a coder or encoder, was a CMC-7 inscriber.  The Belgian GIRO Administration was using 26 of them in 1970, attached to Olympia adding machines.

IBM 1260 
The IBM 1260 Electronic Inscriber was a proofing machine with eight stackers. It could inscribe documents as well as optionally endorse them.  Three or five external stackers could optionally be added.   It was manufactured by IBM Rochester until September 1971, although it remained available for rental for many years afterwards.

It was announced on July 1, 1965, and withdrawn on December 18, 1981.

IBM 4723 
Announced by IBM in May 1982, the IBM 4723 Finance Communication Document Processor is a small desktop reader and inscriber that attached to IBM 3600 or IBM 4700 Banking controllers using the B-Loop connection method.

It was developed by the IBM Nordic Laboratory in Lidingoe Sweden and manufactured by IBM in Greenock, UK.

Reader/Sorters 
There are several families of IBM sorters.  The IBM 1259 (which was an OEM) at 600 documents a minute. The smaller   1255/1270 running at between 500 and 750 documents per minute.     The 1210, 1412, 1419 and 1275 moving from 900 to 1600 documents per minute.   There were two midrange sorters, the 3892 and 3891, released in that order. Finally the IBM 3890 running at 2400 documents per minute.

IBM 1255 / IBM 1270  
The IBM 1255 is a MICR reader/sorter. The IBM 1270 is an OCR reader/sorter that uses the same sorter engine as the IBM 1255 but with more processing hardware.  The CMC-7 models of the IBM 1255 as well as the IBM 1270 were not offered for sale in the United States.

The input hopper holds a 5-1/2" stack of documents that uses a gravity feed.  Each stacker pocket can hold up to 2-1/2" of documents.

Two offline sort patterns are possible but with a 6 stacker sorter, it is typical to sort in two phases.  Phase one sorts on the even digits of one field (using five stackers) with odd digits going to the reject stacker (the top stacker).   Phase two sorts on the odd digits of one field (using five stackers).  The operator can leave the documents from phase one in the stackers when starting phase two.    If a 12 stacker sorter is in use then sorting can be done in a single phase using ten stackers, with the remaining two stackers being used for rejects (using the top stacker of the first bay known as stacker R) and special sorts (using the top stacker of the second bay known as stacker A).

The 1255 and 1270 can be attached to an IBM System/3 using a serial I/O channel adapter.  They can also be attached to an S/370 parallel channel.

IBM 1255 
There are six models, the differences being: maximum speed; stacker count and whether the sorter could read E-13B or CMC-7. Models 1, 2 and 3 are E-13B while models 21, 22 and 23 are CMC-7.   Models 1, 2, 21 and 22 have 6 stacker pockets while Models 3 and 23 have 12.

IBM 1270 
There are four models. Models 1 and 3 have 6 stacker pockets while Models 2 and 4 have 12 stacker pockets.   The machine is both longer and heavier than an IBM 1255.  The majority of the hardware for the extra pockets in the Models 2 and 4 appears to already be present in Models 1 and 3.

IBM 1259 
Announced September 20, 1967 for use with the System/360 Models 20, 30 and 40.  Read and sorted cheques at up to 600 cheques per minute into 11 pockets.   It was withdrawn from marketing on July 16, 1973. It was manufactured for IBM by Lundy Electronics & Systems of Glen Head, New York.  Deliveries began in third quarter of 1968.

Models included 1, 2, 3, 31, 33 and 34.  Specifications below are for the Model 2.

IBM 1210 
Announced on January 1, 1959, it could read and sort E-13B cheques at up  to 900 cheques per minute.     An IBM 1210 Model 4 Sorter-Reader could be attached to an IBM 1401  The model 4 was withdrawn from marketing on September 16, 1960. Models 1, 2 and 3 were withdrawn on April 26, 1966.  The Service Bureau Corporation offered document sorting as a service using the IBM 1210 reader/sorter in 1961.   The Pacific State Bank of Hawthorne, California used the service to sort 11,000 checks a day, sending them daily from their three branches, with SBC returning the sorted cheques the following morning.

IBM 1219 
The IBM 1219 was announced on August 24, 1961, the same day as the IBM 1419.  It sorted magnetically printed or inscribed documents.

The IBM 1219 was withdrawn on Feb 2, 1971.

IBM 1275 Optical Reader Sorter 
The IBM 1275 Recognition System is a check reader sorter that reads OCR fonts rather than MICR fonts. It uses the same sorting engine as the IBM 1419 (and the IBM 1218/1228), but with an additional module for character recognition processing. This was needed because with a transport speed of 6.7 meters per second it needed much faster recognition logic. It was developed by IBM Uithoorn, The Netherlands with support from IBM Rochester and IBM Endicott.

It uses a single vertical column of 82 photodiodes that detect the reflected light from two tungsten filament lamps. Of the 82 photodiodes, 72 cover a scan-band of 9.1mm to detect the OCR character line, with the five photodiodes above and below this used to detect cancellation stamps and irregularities.  The light detection works almost in the infrared band.  It uses an instrumentation system based on the one developed for the IBM 1975.

It can recognise the numbers and four special symbols from the OCR-A and OCR-B fonts.

It ships as three frames:

IBM 1412 
The IBM 1412 can read up to 950 documents using the E-13B font each minute and sort them into 13 pockets. It is functionally similar to the later IBM 1419.  One 1412 Magnetic Character Reader can be connected to an IBM 1401 through a 7080 Serial Input-Output Adapter. The feed hopper can hold a 12-inch stack of 600 to 1, 200 documents, while each pocket can hold a 4.5 inch stack of documents.

IBM 1419 
The IBM 1419 can read up to 1600 documents using the E-13B font each minute and sort them into 13 pockets    IBM claimed it could process up to 96,000 documents per hour.  The first delivery was in November 1962.

In the photo below you can see the documents were added on the right hand side, with a pneumatic arm pushing them upwards to the picker assembly.  The feed hopper could hold a 12-inch stack of 600 to 1, 200 documents.  They were then sorted into one of thirteen pockets that could each hold a 4.5 inch stack of documents. There is a long foot operated pedal bar (close to the ground between the two operators) which could be used to pause feeding while the operator emptied a pocket or dealt with an issue.

In 1970 it was reported that the Belgian GIRO Administration was using two 1419s that could read CMC-7 encoded documents.

IBM 2956 
The IBM 2956 Model 5 (2956-5) is a custom build multi-pocket reader sorter that was ordered by RPQ (Request for Price Quotation) W19976.   

It physically resembles two IBM 1419 reader/sorters connected end to end.  Only the right hand 1419 has a running board (used to hold trays of documents to be sorted) while the feed hopper of the left hand 1419 is covered by two doors.  While it physically has 26 pockets, second hand resellers reported it as having 25.  

The announcement and availability dates for the 2956-5 are not currently known, but the earliest available reference to the IBM 2956-5 (found so far), is January 1968. RPQ W19976 was withdrawn by IBM on March 9, 1981.

It ships as four frames:

Note that the IBM 2956 Model 2 and Model 3 are RPQ optical mark/hole readers which are totally different products.  This can lead to confusion between these devices as they all share the same machine type.

IBM 3890 

IBM introduced the 3890 High Speed Document Processor in June 1973 with shipments to begin in third quarter of 1974.  It was developed by IBM Charlotte and manufactured by IBM Endicott.  This piece of equipment is used by financial institutions to sort and tally all cheques, utility payment and gift certificates at the end of each banking day.  The machine reads the magnetic ink characters (MICR) and/or the optical characters (OCR) that are encoded on the bottom of each document.  This code line facilitates totalling the cheques and sorting them into pockets.  The document process is designed to feed at a rate of 2400 six inch cheques per minute.

The 3890 had the following improvements over the 1419 and 2956-5:

 It was significantly faster, processing up to twice as many documents per hour (100,000 documents per machine per hour)
 Significantly more pockets (up to 36 versus 13 or 26)
 A significantly lower reject rate, up to half that seen previously, dropping as low as 1.3%
 An item numbering feature which printed a sequence number on each document
 Inbuilt jogger which virtually eliminated double feeds or piggybacks (two documents feeding together)

An application called Check Processing Control System (CPCS) is run on a main frame.  It receives the data from the document processor and can store information from the cheques, including the bank number, branch number, account number and the amount the cheque was written for, as well as internal transaction codes. The 3890 can also operate in an offline mode using an SCI (Stacker Control Instruction) program.

The machine is made up of several modules, each performing specific task.  At the far left of the machine is the control unit.  Sort control programs, character recognition and host connection are handled by an IBM PC server in the control unit (3890/XP).  Early A-F models used an IBM System/360 Model 25 processor with magnetic core memory.  It links to all the electronic control systems and cabling that is required to operate the machine.

The next module is the left feed module.  This section of the machine is where cheques are pulled into the transport path.  The MICR line is magnetized and read in this part of the machine.  The MICR information is passed to the control unit for additional processing.  This module also has the ability to insert tracking documents into the stream of cheques in the transport.  On Models A-F, the item numbering feature or INF was also found in the left feed module.  The INF could print a unique 8 digit number on the back of each cheque.

In the front view image the following locations have been indicated.
 This is the input hopper located in the right feed module.  You can see four of the metal stabilising arms that rotated into position to hold the cheques upright as they moved over the wooden jogger plates.   The wooden vertical jogger plate can be seen, although the horizontal plate cannot.
 The input throat is located here.  Cheques entered the transport path at this point.  The documents would proceed horizontally from the right side of the module to the left side and then enter a double S-Bend on the left side of the module.
 Separator documents could be loaded into this hopper and they would be fed into the document stream under software control to separate documents.
 The write head is located here, which magnetised the MICR line
 The read head is located here.  This read the MICR line
 The Item Numbering Feature or INF was located here.  It printed a sequence number on the back of each cheque.   In the model XP this was replaced by the PINE feature, located in the right feed module.

The right feed module performs two functions.  One is the input area, where up to 4800 cheques can be placed to be fed into the left module.  Before this happens, all documents are “jogged” before they are moved into the transport.  This process causes the cheques to be lined up better for feeding into the left feed module; institutions use an external jogger as well. The second function is the Programmable Item Number Endorse system or PINE, which appeared with the model XP1.  It is a high speed ink jet printer used to print document tracking number on each cheque which goes through the machine.  At the same time an “endorsement” stamp is sprayed on to show which institution has handled the cheque. On Models A-F, an “endorsement” stamp is used to show what institution has handled the cheque.

After this, the document passes through two optional modules.  To meet the requirements of the American Banking Association, one of the two must be used.  Until October 2003, the only legal way to provide long term archiving of cheques was microfilm.  This is one of the optional modules.  High speed strobe lights illuminate the cheques and mirrors direct the lit image through a camera onto film.  The front and back of the cheque, plus the item number are transferred to the film.

The other optional module is the Image Capture Processor (ICP).  High speed digital scanners generate pictures of the front and back of the cheque.  To keep up with the speed that documents move by the scanners, four PC's are used – one cheque directed to one PC, the next to the second and so forth.  These images are consolidated to a fifth PC which sends the images to a host computer system, where the digital images can be stored on hard disks.  After this they can be backed up using magnetic tapes for long term archiving.  As of October, 2003, these images, rather than the physical cheques, can be used when institutions needs to exchange cheque information.

The final component on a 3890 is the stacker modules.  Each module has six pockets, and the machine supports up to six stackers for a total of 36 pockets.  The sort control program directs each document to the appropriate pocket.  A cheque might be sorted according to the institution it is drawn against, a customer account, or a utility company.  These pockets allow the physical cheques to be collected and stored in trays.  Each pocket could hold between 800 and 1,000 documents. The operator could remove all but the last 200 to 300 documents without stopping the 3890. Each pocket had a warning light to tell the operator that the pocket was getting full, because once the pocket was full the sorter would stop.  The first pocket in stacker one was the reject pocket, where rejected documents would be sorted.

Programming
The 3890 is programmed by two methods.  The first is SCI (Stacker Control Instructions), which are executed directly by the S/360 in the model A-F machines, and emulated by the PC in the 3890/XP.  The 3890/XP added an additional method of programming, known as Native.  This allowed programs written for the PC to make sort decisions.  The API available to Native programs is the SPXSERV API.

3890 Models 
There were seven models of the 3890.   Models A through F and the model XP1.    For models A through F, the number of stacker modules was also part of the model, so a model A02 had two stacker modules (12 pockets) and a model B04 has four stacker modules(24 pockets).

The E/F Models were announced at the American Banking Association conference on June 13, 1982, in Los Angeles as a lower speed/lower volume sorter for medium-sized financial institutions.  The new models ran at 70% of the speed of the A/B models with first shipments planned for first quarter of 1983.

For the XP1, the stacker count was indicated by feature codes 3022.  By default an XP1 shipped with two stacker modules.

This is a limited table of model differences:

The MICR type for each sorter was set in the factory and could be E-13B or CMC-7.  This was indicated by a feature code.

IBM 3897: Image capture system 
The 3897 Image Capture System was effectively a scanning system which captured images of each cheque using a new special module.  It could capture either the front of each cheque (referred to as the Basic Image System) or the front and back of each cheque (referred to as the Full Image System).

The IBM 3898 Image processor was used to process the scanned images from the IBM 3897 and was not a module in the 3890 itself.   The 3898 was able to recognise printed and handwritten amounts reducing the need for clerical support.

The 3897 and 3898 were announced on March 20, 1990.

Withdrawal
The 3890 had a long history, shipping from 1973 to 2005.  However, in the United States the passing of the Check Clearing for the 21st Century Act (Check 21) on October 28, 2003 (which became effective on October 28, 2004) removed the need to transport and sort checks in large central clearing operations.  Thus reducing the need to use large reader/sorters like the IBM 3890.

 IBM stopped shipping the 3890/XP1 with CMC-7 recognition on May 28, 1996
IBM stopped shipping the 3897 and 3898 on November 29, 1996.
 IBM stopped shipping the 3890/XP1 with OCR recognition on October 30, 1998.   After this only the E-13B version was available
 IBM finally withdrew the 3890/XP1 from marketing on September 27, 2005.

IBM 3891 
IBM 3891 was a document processor that could sort up to 1700 documents per minute into up to 36 pockets.   It was announced by IBM on November 21, 1989.    There was only one model: the 3891 XP1. It was withdrawn by IBM on November 7, 1995

IBM 3892 
IBM 3892 was a document processor that could sort up to 1000 documents per minute into up to 36 pockets.   It was announced by IBM on November 3, 1987.   There were two models: the 001 and the XP1.   It was withdrawn by IBM on November 7, 1995

Hybrid Document Processors 
IBM created two products that were essentially hybrids, combining proofing and inscribing, with data capture and sorting.

IBM 3694 
The IBM 3694 document processor was developed and manufactured by IBM System Products Division (SPD) in Charlotte, North Carolina.  It was announced by IBM on July 28, 1980 with first shipments planned for third quarter of 1981.  It was designed for bank branches, bureaus, smaller banks and financial institutions and could process up to 400 documents per minute.  IBM claimed it could eliminate intermediate manual operations by being able to proof, inscribe, capture data, endorse, number items, microfilm, sort and create master and pocket lists.  The 3694 could be modem attached or up to 18 of them could be attached to an IBM 3602 financial communication controller.  A 3694 could also be configured as a control unit and have four of them attached to it.

IBM added the options of a Microfilm unit and a "Paid" stamp in May 1981.

At the time of announcement an IBM 3694 unit cost between $46,000 and US$67,500 with leases from $1,020 to US$1,505 per month on a two-year lease.   Rental charges ranged from $1,200 to US$1,770 per month.

There were 8 models:

Example customers included:

 Citizens National Bank in Somerset Kentucky.
 Federal Employees Credit Union (FECU) who purchased one around 1982 attached to an IBM 4341
 First National Bank of Warsaw in Indiana
 The National Bank of Coxsackie in New York State, who purchased one in April 1982 and attached it to a System/34.

Endorsement Printing Issue 
On September 1, 1988, a Federally mandated software change was made by IBM to the IBM 3694 to ensure endorsements were printed within a prescribed zone on the back of each document.   This change resulted in a tracking number no longer being printed on the cheque which significantly increased audit times.  IBM committed to resolving the issue in the first quarter of 1989.

The IBM 3694 was withdrawn by IBM on April 23, 1990

IBM 3895 

IBM 3895 was a document reader/inscriber announced by IBM on April 5, 1977.  It was developed by IBM Charlotte and manufactured by IBM Endicott. It could optically read the handwritten dollar and cent amounts written on documents, print that value onto the document (inscribe) and then sort that document.   It could read 525 documents per minute sorting into either 6 or 12 pockets.   IBM claimed at the time of launch that a bank could use a 3895 to proof over 100,000 documents per day, eliminating the need for proof machine operators.  However Mellon Bank in Pittsburg in 1981 was seeing a 50% reject rate, meaning half the documents scanned still needed to be manually proofed. The IBM 3895 was withdrawn by IBM on July 25, 1980

Mechanical jogger 
While IBM did not manufacture or sell a mechanical jogger, the use of a jogger was considered mandatory with all document sorters.   A jogger effectively used vibration to get all the documents to align nicely.  In the photograph of the 3890 used in this article the jogger can be seen directly behind the operator.

Cheque vs Check vs Document 
Note that while IBM referred to the 3890 as a Document Processor, it is also referred to as both a cheque sorter or a check sorter.  In countries like Australia, and the United Kingdom, a bill of exchange drawn on a bank payable on demand is a "cheque", while in the US this is referred to as a "check".  Because the 3890 could also sort documents using OCR (rather than a MICR line printed with E-13B or CMC-7),  the official IBM term for the 3890 was a Document Processor.

References

External links
IBM introduces 3890 Document Processor
A 1412 being delivered to Martins Bank
An IBM Historical Movie that shows a 1419 sorter in operation
1980: A behind the scenes look at how checks were processed - film of a 3890 in action.   The 3890 is shown from 1:44 to 2:06 with views of the main hopper and stackers.

3890